The 14617 / 18 Banmankhi Junction–Amritsar Junction Jan Sewa Express is an Express train belonging to Indian Railways Northern Railway zone that runs between  and  in India.

It operates as train number 14617 from Banmankhi Junction to Amritsar Junction and as train number 14618 in the reverse direction serving the states of Bihar, Uttar Pradesh Uttarakhand, Haryana & Punjab.

Coaches
The 14617 / 18 Banmankhi Junction–Amritsar Junction Jan Sewa Express has 22 general unreserved & two SLR (seating with luggage rake) coaches. It does not carry a pantry car.

As is customary with most train services in India, coach composition may be amended at the discretion of Indian Railways depending on demand.

Service

Routing

Traction

References

External links
14617 Jan Sewa Express at India Rail Info
14618 Jan Sewa Express at India Rail Info

Transport in Amritsar
Rail transport in Punjab, India
Rail transport in Haryana
Rail transport in Uttar Pradesh
Rail transport in Bihar
Transport in Saharsa
Express trains in India